Sarbinowo  is a village in north-central Poland, located in the administrative district of Gmina Żnin, within Żnin County, Kuyavian-Pomeranian Voivodeship.

The village has a population of 540.

References

Sarbinowo